The White Range is a subrange of the Tagish Highland, located east of Windy Arm on the British Columbia-Yukon border in Canada.

References

White Range in the Canadian Mountain Encyclopedia

Mountain ranges of British Columbia
Mountain ranges of Yukon